Air Chief Marshal Lakshman Madhav Katre, PVSM, AVSM and Bar (1926-1985) was the head of the Indian Air Force from 1984 to 1985, as Chief of the Air Staff —and the second IAF Chief of Staff to die in— harness. He was awarded the Param Vishisht Seva Medal and Ati Vishisht Seva Medal and Bar. He completed his schooling from The Doon School, Dehradun, India.
In his career in the lAF, he has commanded with distinction Operational Squadrons and Squadrons and stations and the Air Force Academy. During 1971 war he successfully conducted uninterrupted operations from one of the most forward airfields and one, which was regularly attacked by the PAF. This was due to his meticulous planning.

As the Commandant of the Air Force Academy at Dundigal, he expanded the facilities to cater for the training of Ground duty officers. Flying activity at the base was successfully reoriented for advance training on jet aircraft and safety record achieved during his tenure. On completion of the Royal College of Defence Studies Course in England in 1976, he was appointed Senior Air Staff officer of a major Air Command. Under his direction, the operational effectiveness of the forces in the command increased manifold. With his wide experience of fighter flying he was able to conduct various air exercises which simulated realistic battle conditions.

The Katre House in The Air Force School ( Subroto Park)  has been named after him.

He died suddenly while in service, on 01 July 1985.

Military Honours and Awards

References

The Doon School alumni
Indian aviators
Chiefs of Air Staff (India)
Indian Air Force air marshals
Recipients of the Param Vishisht Seva Medal
Recipients of the Ati Vishisht Seva Medal
1926 births
1985 deaths
Indian Air Force officers
Commandants of the Indian Air Force Academy